Absalom Shade Allan (November 26, 1843 – February 1, 1928) was an Ontario merchant and political figure. He represented Wellington West in the Legislative Assembly of Ontario as a Liberal member from 1886 to 1894.

He was born near Preston, Canada West in 1843, the son of Alexander Allan, who came from Aberdeen, Scotland. His uncle Absalom Shade founded Galt. Allan was educated in Preston, Elora and Toronto. He taught school and then worked as a bookkeeper in Elora.

In 1868, he moved to the village of Clifford, where he opened a general store. He married Kate Bullock in 1871. Allan served as the first reeve for Clifford and was warden for Wellington County from 1884 to 1885. He was also a justice of the peace. Allan served as master in the local Masonic lodge and was a member of the Presbyterian church, serving for a time as superintendent of the village Sunday school. In 1893, he helped draft a Children's Protection Act. He was defeated in the 1894 election. In 1901, Allan was appointed sheriff for Wellington County and he moved to Guelph.

References

External links 
The Way It Was : A History of Minto Township, CM Harrison (1978)
Guelph : Perspectives on a Century of Change 1900-2000 (2000)
Transcription from Wellington County Atlas, 1906

1843 births
1928 deaths
Canadian people of Scottish descent
Canadian Presbyterians
Ontario Liberal Party MPPs
Canadian justices of the peace